The 2017–18 National Ringette League season for the sport of ringette was the 14th season of the National Ringette League and began on September 30, 2017 and ended on April 14, 2018.

The Atlantic Attack won the national championship and their first national title by defeating the Edmonton WAM! 5–3.

Teams 
Gloucester Devils did not play for the season.

Regular Seasons 
For East division red teams, they play 4 games each to 2 teams from the same color and 2 game each to 3 teams from the same color. They also play 2 games to 4 white color teams.

For East division white teams, they play 3 games each to same color team and 2 games each to 5 red color teams.

For West division team, they play 6 games each to same division teams.

The number of home games and that of away games may not be the same.

Standings 
d indicates clinches the Division and the Championship (Elite Eight)
x indicates clinches the playoff
y indicates clinches the Conference and the Championship (Elite Eight)

East Conference

West Conference

Playoffs

Awards 
MVP: Shaundra Bruvall (CGY)

Stats 
Regular season
 Player expect goalie
 Goal
 East Martine Caissie (46, ATL)
 West Shaundra Bruvall (43, CGY)
 Assist
 East Kaitlyn Youldon (63, GAT)
 West Justine Exner (34, CGY)
 Point
 East Julie Blanchette, Kaitlyn Youldon (100, MTL and GAT respectively)
 West Shaundra Bruvall (88, CGY)
Goalie
Saving %
East Jessie Callander (.920, CAM) 
West Ellen Hoban (.909, CGY)
Goals against average
East Jessie Callander (3.22, CAM)  
West Breanna Beck  (2.90, EDM)
Win
East Danni Walser (12, CAM) 
West Ellen Hoban (10, CGY)
Playoff

References 

National Ringette League
Ringette
Ringette competitions